Moina mongolica is a species of crustacean belonging to the family Moinidae.

The species inhabits freshwater environments.

References

Diplostraca